Sunland Estates is an unincorporated community and census-designated place (CDP) in Grant County, Washington, United States. As of the 2020 census, it had a population of 179.

The CDP is on the western edge of the county, on the east bank of the Columbia River.

References 

Populated places in Grant County, Washington
Census-designated places in Grant County, Washington
Census-designated places in Washington (state)